is a National Government Park established in Asuka, Nara Prefecture, Japan in 1974. The park comprises five areas: the Amakashi-no-Oka Area, where there is an observatory with a view over the old capitals of Asuka and Fujiwara-kyō and of Yamato Sanzan; the Iwaido Area, similarly with views to Yamato Sanzan as well as over the terraced rice fields of "Inner Asuka"; the Ishibutai Area; the Takamatsuzuka Area; and the Kitora Tumulus Area.

See also

 Asuka-Fujiwara
 Asuka Historical Museum

References

External links
  Asuka Historical National Government Park
  Asuka Historical National Government Park

Parks and gardens in Nara Prefecture
Asuka, Nara
National Government Parks of Japan
Protected areas established in 1974
1974 establishments in Japan